Mylothris pluviata is a butterfly in the family Pieridae. It is found in eastern Tanzania. The habitat consists of submontane and montane forests.

References

Butterflies described in 1980
Pierini
Endemic fauna of Tanzania
Butterflies of Africa